Visalakhi Nityanand is an Indian Carnatic music vocalist. She is the daughter and student of Trivandrum R. S. Mani.

References

Women Carnatic singers
Carnatic singers
Living people
Year of birth missing (living people)
Place of birth missing (living people)